The Highland Bridge is the third of three pedestrian bridges to connect Downtown Denver with the Highland neighborhood.  The bridge crosses the Valley Highway (Interstate 25) between Platte Street and Central Street as an extension of the 16th Street Mall.

The bridge was opened on December 16, 2006. It is 325 feet long and cost US $5.2 million to build.

See also
Denver Millennium Bridge
Platte River Bridge

External links
Denverinfill.com Central Platte Valley District
Construction Photography - Highlands Bridge
DenverInfill Blog: Denver's Highland Bridge Dedication
Yelp Reviews

Through arch bridges in the United States
Pedestrian bridges in Colorado
Transportation buildings and structures in Denver